Diku might refer to:

Emperor Ku (Di Ku, Diku 帝嚳) of ancient China
DikuMUD, a video game
Department of Computer Science (University of Copenhagen) (DIKU)